Chalarinae is a subfamily of big-headed flies (insects in the family Pipunculidae).

Genera
 Genus Chalarus Walker, 1834
 Genus Jassidophaga Aczél, 1939
 Genus Protoverrallia Aczél, 1948 Baltic amber Eocene (Priabonian)
 Genus Verrallia Mik, 1899

References

Pipunculidae
Brachycera subfamilies